Ruslan Nailevich Mukhametshin (born 29 October 1981) is a Russian professional football coach and a former player. He is an assistant coach for FC Mordovia Saransk.

Career

Club

Rubin Kazan
The day after signing, he made the match squad for Rubin's trip to FC Ural Sverdlovsk Oblast, baring the number 81 shirt. However, he remained on the bench for the entire game.

Personal life
Mukhametshin's younger brother Rustem is also a professional footballer, currently playing for FC Tosno.

Honours
 Russian Second Division, Zone Ural-Povolzhye top scorer: 2009 (19 goals).
 Russian Second Division, Zone Ural-Povolzhye best player and best striker: 2009.
 Football Championship of the National League winner: 2011/12
 Football Championship of the National League top scorer (31 goals): 2011/12

References

External links
 

1981 births
Footballers from Kazan
Living people
Russian footballers
FC Mordovia Saransk players
Russian Premier League players
FC Rubin Kazan players
FC Arsenal Tula players
FC Taraz players
Russian expatriate footballers
Expatriate footballers in Kazakhstan
Association football forwards